Hilton Lobberts (born 11 June 1986) is a South African rugby union player for the  in the Currie Cup and Rugby Challenge competitions.

Career
In 2013, he joined  for the 2012 Currie Cup Premier Division season.

References

External links

itsrugby.co.uk profile

Living people
1986 births
South African rugby union players
Stormers players
South Africa international rugby union players
Western Province (rugby union) players
Bulls (rugby union) players
Blue Bulls players
Boland Cavaliers players
Griquas (rugby union) players
Cheetahs (rugby union) players
Sportspeople from Paarl
Rugby union locks
Rugby union flankers
Expatriate rugby union players in Italy
South African expatriates in Italy
Free State Cheetahs players
Pumas (Currie Cup) players
Rugby union players from the Western Cape